Morgan Hoffmann (born August 11, 1989) is an American professional golfer.

Raised in Ringwood, New Jersey, Hoffmann attended Ramapo High School. After winning two consecutive New Jersey state championships, Hoffmann relocated to the International Junior Golf Academy in Hilton Head, South Carolina to take advantage of the warm-weather and training opportunities. Hoffmann's girlfriend is Chelsea Colvard, they met while she was living in Miami through mutual Oklahoma State University friends. 

Hoffmann spent two years attending Oklahoma State University where he played on the golf team. As a highly rated amateur, he held the number one spot in the World Amateur Golf Ranking for a time in 2009, and played in that year's Walker Cup.

After playing in the 2010 U.S. Open, Hoffmann decide to leave college early in order to turn professional. He qualified for his first professional major at the 2012 U.S. Open, finishing in a tie for 29th.

Hoffmann has been a resident of Saddle Brook, New Jersey.

Hoffmann played on the Web.com Tour in 2012, starting the season with no status and getting by on sponsor exemptions and Monday qualifiers. He played in 13 events and finished 19th on the money list, which earned him a promotion to the PGA Tour.  In 2017, Hoffmann finished T2 at The Honda Classic, which is his highest finish in his career.

In December 2017, Hoffmann announced that he had been diagnosed with facioscapulohumeral muscular dystrophy. In the days afterwards, Hoffmann was inundated and overwhelmed by messages of support from his fellow pros and members of the public. In April 2022, Hoffman returned after undergoing treatment, and is competing on the PGA Tour for the first time in three years.

Playoff record
Web.com Tour playoff record (0–1)

Results in major championships

CUT = missed the half-way cut
"T" = tied

Results in World Golf Championships

"T" = Tied

U.S. national team appearances
Amateur
Walker Cup: 2009 (winners)
Palmer Cup: 2009

See also
2012 Web.com Tour graduates

References

External links

American male golfers
Oklahoma State Cowboys golfers
PGA Tour golfers
Korn Ferry Tour graduates
Golfers from New Jersey
Golfers from Florida
People from Jupiter, Florida
People from Franklin Lakes, New Jersey
People from Saddle Brook, New Jersey
People from Wyckoff, New Jersey
Ramapo High School (New Jersey) alumni
Sportspeople from Bergen County, New Jersey
1989 births
Living people